SMS Deutschland  was the second and final ship of the s;  was her sister ship. Named for Germany (Deutschland in German), the ship was laid down in the Samuda Brothers shipyard in London in 1872. The ship was launched in September 1874 and commissioned into the German fleet in July 1875. Deutschland mounted a main battery of eight  guns in a central battery amidships. She was the last capital ship built for the German Navy by a foreign ship-builder; all subsequent ships were built in Germany.

Deutschland served with the fleet from her commissioning until 1896, though she was frequently placed in reserve throughout her career. The ship was a regular participant in the annual fleet training maneuvers conducted with the exception of the mid-1880s, when she was temporarily replaced by newer vessels. She participated in several cruises in the Baltic and Mediterranean, often escorting Kaiser Wilhelm II on official state visits. Deutschland was rebuilt in the early 1890s as an armored cruiser, though she was too slow to perform satisfactorily in this role. Nevertheless, she spent three years in the East Asia Squadron before returning to Germany in 1900. She was used in secondary roles after 1904, until 1908 when she was sold and broken up for scrap.

Design 

Designed by Edward James Reed in 1869, the ships were among the most powerful casemate ships built by any navy, though they were rendered obsolescent by the time they were completed by the advent of the turret ship.

Deutschland was powered by one 2-cylinder single-expansion steam engine, which was supplied with steam by eight coal-fired trunk boilers. The boilers were vented into two widely spaced funnels. She was also equipped with a full ship rig to supplement the steam engines. Her standard complement consisted of 32 officers and 568 enlisted men.

She was armed with a main battery of eight  L/20 guns mounted in a central casemate amidships. As built, the ship was also equipped with a single  L/22 gun. After being rebuilt in 1891–1895, her armament was increased by six  L/22 guns and one 8.8 cm L/30 gun, four and later twelve  auto-cannons for defense against torpedo boats. She also received five  torpedo tubes, all mounted in the ship's hull below the waterline. 

Service history 

Deutschland was ordered by the Imperial Navy from the Samuda Brothers shipyard in London, UK; her keel was laid in 1872. Deutschland and her sister Kaiser were ordered shortly after the end of the Franco-Prussian War, under the assumption that the French would quickly attempt a war of revenge. The ship was launched on 12 September 1874 and commissioned into the German fleet on 20 July 1875. She was the last German capital ship built by a foreign shipbuilder.

Following her commissioning in July 1875, a German crew sailed Deutschland to Germany. She arrived too late, however, to participate in the annual summer training maneuvers. At around the time Batch's squadron was working up for the summer cruise, the German consul in Salonika, then in the Ottoman Empire, was murdered. Further attacks on German citizens living in the area were feared, and so Batsch was ordered to sail to the Mediterranean Sea to stage a naval demonstration in June 1876. After arriving with the four ironclads, he was reinforced by three unarmored vessels. After the threat of violence subsided in August, Batsch departed with Kaiser and Deutschland; the other two ironclads remained in the Mediterranean for the rest of the summer.

For the 1877 maneuvers, the new turret ironclad  replaced Kronprinz. The squadron was again sent to the Mediterranean, in response to unrest in the Ottoman Empire related to the Russo-Turkish War; the violence threatened German citizens living there. The squadron, again under the command of Batsch, steamed to the ports of Haifa and Jaffa in July 1877, but found no significant tensions ashore. Batsch then departed and cruised the Mediterranean for the remainder of the summer, returning to Germany in October. Deutschland and her sister Kaiser remained in reserve for the next six years. They were reactivated in the spring of 1883 for the summer maneuvers under the command of Wilhelm von Wickede. Due to their long period out of service, their engines proved troublesome during the training cruise. Indeed, the maneuvers were temporarily put on hold when the steam plants in Deutschland, Kaiser, and Kronprinz broke down. Regardless, the 1883 cruise was the first year the German navy completely abandoned the use of sails on its large ironclads. Deutschland went into reserve during the 1884 maneuvers, which were conducted by a homogenous squadron composed of the four s.

The ship did not see active duty again until the summer of 1889, when Deutschland joined the fleet that steamed to Great Britain to celebrate the coronation of Kaiser Wilhelm II; the ship joined her sister Kaiser and the turret ships Preussen and Friedrich der Grosse in II Division. The fleet then held training maneuvers in the North Sea under command of Rear Admiral Friedrich Hollmann. Deutschland and the rest of II Division became the training squadron for the fleet in 1889–1890, the first year the Kaiserliche Marine maintained a year-round ironclad force. The squadron escorted Wilhelm II's imperial yacht to the Mediterranean; the voyage included state visits to Italy and the Ottoman Empire. The squadron remained in the Mediterranean until April 1890, when it returned to Germany. Deutschland participated in the ceremonial transfer of the island of Helgoland from British to German control in the summer of 1890. She was present during the fleet maneuvers in September, where the entire eight-ship armored squadron simulated a Russian fleet blockading Kiel. II Division, including Deutschland, served as the training squadron in the winter of 1890–1891. The squadron again cruised the Mediterranean, under the command of Rear Admiral Wilhelm Schröder.

The squadron carried over for the fleet maneuvers during the summer of 1893, when they were joined by the four Sachsen-class vessels. In November 1893, the Deutschland, König Wilhelm, and Friedrich der Grosse were joined by the brand-new pre-dreadnought battleship , under the command of Otto von Diederichs. The squadron participated in the fall maneuvers in 1894, which simulated a two-front war against France and Russia; Deutschlands squadron acted as the Russian fleet during the exercises. Between 1894 and 1897, Deutschland was rebuilt in the Imperial Dockyard in Wilhelmshaven. The ship was converted into an armored cruiser; her heavy guns were removed and replaced with lighter weapons, including eight  and eight  guns. Her entire rigging equipment was removed and two heavy military masts were installed in place of the rigging. Despite the modernization, she remained quite slow. Kaiser and the old ironclad König Wilhelm were similarly converted. Deutschland rejoined the fleet on 25 January 1897.

Following Diederichs's seizure of Kiautschou Bay in November 1897, Deutschland, the protected cruiser , and the light cruisers  and  reinforced the East Asia Cruiser Division. The arrival of the four ships allowed the division to be expanded to the East Asia Squadron. Prince Heinrich, with his flag aboard Deutschland, departed Germany in December 1897 with Gefion; the two ships arrived in Hong Kong in March 1898. Prince Heinrich took the two ships on a tour of Asia, culminating in a state visit to Peking in April. While most of the Squadron went to the Philippines to safeguard German interests during the Spanish–American War in the summer of 1898, Deutschland, Gefion, and  remained in Chinese waters. On 14 April 1899, Diederichs left the East Asia Squadron; command passed to Prince Henry and Deutschland became the Squadron flagship.

Deutschland remained on the East Asia station until early 1900, when she travelled via the Mediterranean and Portsmouth to Kiel. After returning to Germany, Deutschland was used as a harbor ship, starting on 3 May 1904. She was renamed Jupiter on 22 November of that year. On 21 May 1906, the ship was stricken from the naval register and used briefly as a target ship in 1907. The Kaiserliche Marine sold the ship in 1908 for 120,000 marks; she was broken up for scrap the following year in Hamburg-Moorburg.

Footnotes

Notes

Citations

References 

 
 
 
 
 
 

Kaiser-class ironclads
Ships built in Cubitt Town
1874 ships